Matters of Discretion: An Autobiography is an autobiography by a former Prime Minister of India Inder Kumar Gujral and the only one to be written by a former Indian Prime Minister thus far.

Synopsis 
It deals with Gujral's life starting with partition and his moving to India and provides an exposition of his public life.

Structure 
The book is divided into four parts, namely:

 Entry into the Whirlpool of Politics
 From Politics to Diplomacy
 Back into the Whirlpool of Politics
 My Tenure as Prime Minister

Pictures 
The book has several pictures of Gujral with various dignitaries.

References

2011 non-fiction books
Indian autobiographies
Political autobiographies
Books about politics of India
21st-century Indian books

Books by prime ministers of India
Gujral administration
Penguin Books India books